Geoff Turner (7 September 1928 – 8 September 2017) was an Australian rules footballer who played for the St Kilda Football Club in the Victorian Football League (VFL).

Notes

External links 

1928 births
2017 deaths
Australian rules footballers from Victoria (Australia)
St Kilda Football Club players
Brighton Football Club players